The following is a list of notable property developers based in New York:

 Boston Properties
 Durst Organization
 Extell Development Company
 Silverstein Properties
 The Trump Organization
 Thor Equities

References 

Property Developers
Companies, Property Developers